Carina Mia (foaled January 27, 2013) is an American Thoroughbred racehorse who won the 2016 Acorn Stakes.

Career

Carina Mia's first race was on October 10, 2015 at Keeneland. She finished in 2nd. 

On November 28, 2015, she won the Golden Rod Stakes.

In 2016, she captured both the Eight Belles Stakes and the Acorn Stakes, winning both races with the Acorn Stakes being her first Grade 1 victory. This would be her first and last Grade 1 victory. He was then entered in the 2016 Coaching Club American Oaks in July, but finished in 2nd place. That was followed up with a 3rd place result in the August 2016 Ballerina Stakes.<

The horse's last race was on November 4, 2017, when she finished in 3rd at the Breeders' Cup Filly & Mare Sprint, after a disappointing season.

Pedigree

References

2013 racehorse births
Racehorses bred in Kentucky
Racehorses trained in the United States
Thoroughbred family 7